Allied Communications Publications are documents developed by the Combined Communications-Electronics Board and NATO, which define the procedures for communicating in computer messaging, radiotelephony, radiotelegraph, radioteletype (RATT), air-to-ground signalling (panel signalling), and other forms of communications used by the armed forces of the five CCEB member countries and/or NATO.

See also
 Allied Communication Procedures

References 

Military communications
Military standardization